Al-Yateematain (The Two Orphans) is a 1949 Egyptian drama film written by Abo El Seoud El Ebiary directed by Hassan Al Imam starring Egyptian actress Faten Hamama. The film was based on the play The Two Orphans by Adolphe d'Ennery and Eugène Cormon.

Plot 
Hamama portrays the role of Neimat, a young girl who loses her sight due to a wrong usage of sodium as eye drops, and who is exploited later by a gangster who forces her to be a beggar in the streets.

Cast 
 Faten Hamama
 Souraya Helmy
 Negma Ibrahim

External links
 

1949 films
1940s Arabic-language films
1949 drama films
Films about orphans
Egyptian films based on plays
Egyptian drama films
Egyptian black-and-white films
Films directed by Hassan al-Imam